Top of the Park is a community of historic townhouse condominia located in Silver Spring, Maryland. It was built as an apartment complex in 1941 and converted into 2-and 3-bedroom condominia in 1980. The 166 townhouses – all built of red brick in the Colonial Revival style – are nestled in a wooded area above Sligo Creek Park near Piney Branch Road, about a mile from downtown Silver Spring.

External links
Top of the Park website

Buildings and structures in Montgomery County, Maryland